Ethyl 3-bromopropionate is the organobromine compound with the formula BrCH2CH2CO2C2H5.  It is a colorless liquid and an alkylating agent.  It is prepared by the esterification of 3-bromopropionic acid.  Alternatively, it can be prepared by hydrobromination of ethyl acrylate, a reaction that proceeds in an anti-Markovnikov sense.

See also
Ethyl bromoacetate

References

Alkylating agents
Ethyl esters
Propionate esters
Organobromides
Reagents for organic chemistry